Ángel Jesus Rivillo Ruiz (born July 25, 1978) is a former Venezuelan soccer player who played for the Dallas Burn in the MLS.

Club career
Rivillo was born in Toulouse, France, and moved to Caracas, Venezuela where he played his youth years until he moved to Dallas, Texas in 1994. He joined local side Dallas Inter, before going on to study at both East Texas Baptist University and Creighton University. He was drafted in the sixth round of the 2000 MLS SuperDraft by Dallas Burn, with whom he made one league appearance in the 2000 Major League Soccer season.

After being released by Dallas Burn, Rivillo moved to France to play for Toulouse Fontaines, before returning to his native Venezuela to join Deportivo Táchira.

International career
Rivillo represented Venezuela at under-15, under-17 and under-23 level.

Career statistics

Club

Notes

References

1978 births
Living people
Venezuelan footballers
Venezuelan expatriate footballers
Venezuela youth international footballers
Association football midfielders
FC Dallas players
Nashville Metros players
DFW Tornados players
Toulouse Fontaines Club players
Deportivo Táchira F.C. players
Milwaukee Rampage players
Milwaukee Wave players
Chicago Fire FC players
Atlanta Silverbacks players
Philadelphia KiXX players
New York Red Bulls players
Major League Soccer players
A-League (1995–2004) players
USL Second Division players
Major Indoor Soccer League (2001–2008) players
USL First Division players
Major Indoor Soccer League (2008–2014) players
Major Arena Soccer League players
Venezuelan expatriate sportspeople in the United States
Expatriate soccer players in the United States
Venezuelan expatriate sportspeople in France
Expatriate footballers in France